Charles Harrison Brown (October 22, 1920 – June 10, 2003) was a two-term U.S. representative from Missouri's 7th congressional district from 1957–61, and is the most recent Democrat to serve from that district.

Brown was born in Coweta, Oklahoma, attended public schools in Humansville and Republic, Missouri, and high school in Springfield. He attended Drury College in 1937, 1938 and 1940 and George Washington University in Washington, D.C. in 1939.

From 1937–38, Brown was program director of KWTO-AM in Springfield, where he had been an announcer at age 16.  He was radio publicity director for the Missouri Conservation Commission in 1940, and was an account executive for an advertising agency in St. Louis, Missouri from 1943 to 1945.

He founded and was president of Brown Radio-TV Productions, Inc. in Springfield; and was a partner with the Brown Brothers Advertising Agency, with offices in Nashville, Tennessee; St. Louis; and Springfield. He briefly produced The Eddy Arnold Show on ABC-TV in 1956 before resigning in August of that year after he had won the primary election.

Brown served as delegate to Democratic state and national conventions in 1956, 1960 and 1964. He was elected as a Democrat to the 85th and 86th Congresses (January 3, 1957 – January 3, 1961), but was an unsuccessful candidate for reelection in 1960. Brown voted in favor of the Civil Rights Acts of 1957 and 1960.

He became a public relations consultant in Washington, D.C. and Los Angeles, California, and was senior vice president of an oil refining company in Los Angeles from 1973 to 1979. Brown died on June 10, 2003, in Henderson, Nevada at age 82.

Notes

References

1920 births
2003 deaths
Politicians from Springfield, Missouri
Democratic Party members of the United States House of Representatives from Missouri
Drury University alumni
20th-century American politicians
People from Coweta, Oklahoma